"Save My Soul" is a 1994 song by Decadance, a Eurodance project by Austrian composer, music producer and entertainment entrepreneur Norbert Reichart. It peaked at number five on the singles chart in Austria and stayed within Ö3 Austria Top 40 for 12 weeks. On the Eurochart Hot 100, it reached number 76. A music video was also produced to promote the single.

Track listing

Charts

References

External links
 Decadance on Discogs

1994 singles
House music songs
Eurodance songs
1994 songs